The following is a chronological list of classical music composers who have lived in, worked in, or been citizens of Spain.

Renaissance

Baroque

Classical era

Romantic

Modern/Contemporary

 
Spanish
Composers
Spanish music-related lists